Saban Films is an entertainment production and distribution studio founded in . The studio is a subsidiary of American investment group Saban Capital Group. This article lists films which have been distributed or co-distributed by Saban Films as well as upcoming releases.

Released

2010s

2020s

Upcoming

Undated films

References

External links
 Official website

Film distributors of the United States
Film production companies of the United States